LRV may refer to:

L.R.V. video
Lenticular Reentry Vehicle
Log removal value, a measure of the ability of a treatment processes to remove pathogenic microorganisms  
Lunar Roving Vehicle
Light reflectance value
Light rail vehicle
Light Reconnaissance vehicle, another name for a Reconnaissance vehicle

See also 
 Boeing LRV